The list of ship launches in 1984 includes a chronological list of all ships launched in 1984.


References

1984
Ship launches